Crimea Air was an airline on the grounds of Simferopol International Airport in Simferopol, Crimea. It was established and started operations on 4 October 1996 and operated regional feeder services. Its main base was Simferopol International Airport. Crimea Air was liquidated in 2007.

Its IATA code has been since reassigned to Arkefly.

Fleet 
The Crimea Air fleet consisted of the following aircraft:

2 Yakovlev Yak-42
7 Antonov An-24
1 Antonov An-26

References

Defunct airlines of Ukraine
Airlines established in 1996
Economy of Crimea